Marcel van Eeden (born 22 November 1965, in The Hague, Netherlands) is a Dutch draftsman and painter. From 1989 to 1993 van Eeden studied painting at the Royal Academy of Art in The Hague. Van Eeden lives and works in Zurich and The Hague. Characteristically, van Eeden's work is reminiscent of the film-noir period, of almost photo-realistic depictions and he manipulates the use of the black and white contrast. A wider audience was introduced to his work after his contribution to the Berlin Biennale in 2006.

Works
Marcel van Eeden is primarily recognised for his drawings, for which he mainly works with charcoal pencils, however he also uses coloured pencils or water-colour paint. The majority of the drawings have a 19 cm x 28 cm / 7,5" x 11"  format.  Van Eeden produced a drawing everyday from 2001–2007, which he published daily onto his blog. In 2007, he concluded the blog and returned for the first time since his studies to painting, however he does continue to draw. Van Eeden's paintings, as well as his drawings, utilise a variety of templates, which are all taken from the years before his date of birth, 1965. Van Eeden calls this project "The Encyclopedia of my Death". The templates include photographs, exhibition catalogues, newspaper clippings, magazines and illustrations or even cloth patterns. Many of the works show nocturnal urban scenes, fires, abstract shapes and patterns as well as short excerpts of stencilled texts. By focussing on the virtually infinite time span before his birth, van Eeden accepts his own existence as a merely insignificant part of a genuine time stream and discards the finiteness of his own existence.

Van Eeden assembles both his paintings and drawings in the same manner; in both mediums, he pursues a picturesque approach and focuses more on the images' grey tonal composition rather than the line. In this respect, he compares his work to the pastel chalk drawings of Edgar Degas.

In 2004/2005 van Eeden began to group his drawings together to form different sized series. This was inspired, amongst other things, by Robert Walser's „Spaziergang“ text which extended over a collection of drawings or constantly recurring characters.

The first great series to emerge from this modus was the 150 piece series „K. M. Wiegand. Life and Work“, 2006. K. M. Wiegand is a real historical botanist, whose biography can be found cited as short passages of text on the drawings. Through the combination of images, which do not necessarily have anything to do with the particular passages of text, van Eeden constructs a fictional biography for the botanist. This approach was recycled in later series', such as „Celia“, 2004–2006 and „The Archeologist. The Travels of Oswald Sollmann“, 2007 and „The death of Matheus Boryna“, 2007. The protagonists of these series', K.M. Wiegand, Celia Copplestone, Oswald Sollmann and Matheus Boryna, are featured together in the work „Witness for the prosecution“, in 2008.

Solo exhibitions
 2004: Museum Franz Gertsch, Burgdorf, Switzerland
 2006: Celia, Kunstverein Hannover, Germany
 2006: Museum Dhondt Dhaenens, Deurle, Belgium
 2007: The Archaeologist - The Travels of Oswald Sollmann, Kunsthalle Tübingen, Germany
 2008: Kunstverein Heidelberg, Germany
 2008: The Archaeologist - The Travels of Oswald Sollmann, Centro de Arte Contemporáneo de Caja de Burgos, Spain
 2008: Centraal Museum Utrecht, the Netherlands
 2009: The Zurich Trial. Part 1: Witness for the Prosecution, Kunsthalle Hamburg, Germany
 2010: Cornelia Maersk, Nederlands Fotomuseum, Rotterdam, The Netherlands
 2010: The Sollmann Collection, Baloise Kunstforum, Basel, Switzerland
 2010: Haus am Waldsee - Ort internationaler Gegenwartskunst, Berlin, Germany

Group exhibitions 
 2004: Zeichnung vernetzt, Städtische Galerie Delmenhorst, Germany
 2005: Gesehene Worte, Kunsthaus Langenthal, Switzerland
 2005: Into Drawing, Contemporary Dutch Drawings, Limerick City Gallery of Art, Limerick, Ireland
 2006: Anstoß Berlin - Kunst macht Welt, Haus am Waldsee - Ort internationaler Gegenwartskunst, Berlin, Germany
 2006: K. M. Wiegand. Life and Work. Fourth Berlin Biennale für zeitgenössische Kunst, Berlin, Germany
 2007: Against Time, Bonniers Konsthall, Stockholm, Sweden
 2007: Eyes Wide Open - New to the Stedelijk Museum & The Monique Zajfen Collection, Stedelijk Museum, Amsterdam, the Netherlands
 2007: Made in Germany, Kestnergesellschaft, Hannover, Germany
 2008: Into Drawing - Zeitgenössische Niederländische Zeichnungen, Stiftung Museum Schloss Moyland, Bedberg-Hau, Germany
 2008: Lügen.nirgends - Zwischen Fiktion, Dokumentation und Wirklichkeit, Ausstellungshalle zeitgenössische Kunst Münster, Germany
 2008: Of this tale, I cannot guarantee a single word, Royal College of Art, London, England
 2009: Compass in Hand: Selections from The Judith Rothschild Foundation Contemporary Drawings Collection, Museum of Modern Art, New York, USA
 2009: Die Unsichtbare Hand, Städtische Galerie Delmenhorst, Germany
 2009: Gestern oder im 2. Stock. Karl Valentin, Kunst und Komik seit 1948, Stadtmuseum München, Germany
 2009: Grenzgänge. Junge Künstler auf der Suche nach der Moderne im 21. Jahrhundert, Kunstmuseum Wolfsburg, Germany
 2009: Zeigen. Eine Audiotour durch Berlin von Karin Sander, Temporäre Kunsthalle Berlin, Germany
 2010: LINIE LINE LINEA, Zeichnung der Gegenwart, Kunstmuseum Bonn, Germany

Notes

Literature
Stephan Berg (ed.): Marcel van Eeden. Celia ( in collaboration with the exhibition "Marcel van Eeden. Celia", Kunstverein Hannover, Germany 2006) Ostfildern, Germany 2006.
Berlin-Berlinale for contemporary art/Galerie Michael Zink (ed.): Marcel van Eeden. K. M. Wiegand, Life and Work, Ostfildern, Germany 2006.
Spieler, Reinhard: Marcel van Eeden. Drawings (in collaboration with the exhibition with Marcel van Eeden. Drawings, Museum Franz Gertsch, Burgdorf, Germany 2004), Burgdorf, Germany 2004.
Putzke, Markus: Marcel van Eeden : tekeningen, Zeichnungen, drawings, dibujos 1993 - 2003, Nürnberg, Germany 2003.

External links
 website of the artist
 drawings and paintings

1965 births
Living people
Dutch painters
Dutch male painters
Artists from The Hague
Contemporary painters
Royal Academy of Art, The Hague alumni
Academic staff of the Royal Academy of Art, The Hague